Lyle Lakay (born 17 August 1991) is a South African professional soccer player who plays a midfielder for Cape Town City in the Premier Soccer League.

Club career
He is a product of the SuperSport United's youth academy, he was promoted to the first team in 2009 but spent the 2009–10 season with National First Division side Cape Town. For the 2010–11 season he returned to Supersport United. After another loan spell with FC Cape Town, Lakay joined Bloemfontein Celtic in 2012. He is expected to sign for the big spending Pretoria side, Mamelodi Sundowns FC during the January transfer window 2014. On 14 November 2013, the player was quoted to have said, "Yes, I arrived today in Tshwane, but I will start training with Sundowns tomorrow (Friday). I hope everything will go well."

International career
In 2011, he was called up to the South Africa U-20 team for the 2011 African Youth Championship.

References

External links
 

1991 births
Living people
South African soccer players
Soccer players from Cape Town
Association football midfielders
SuperSport United F.C. players
F.C. Cape Town players
Bloemfontein Celtic F.C. players
Cape Town City F.C. (2016) players
Mamelodi Sundowns F.C. players
South African Premier Division players
National First Division players
South Africa international soccer players
Cape Coloureds